Golf is a 1922 American silent comedy film starring Larry Semon and featuring Oliver Hardy. The film has been released on DVD.

Plot
Using a drill to make holes in his floor, a golfer (Larry Semon) refuses to stop playing, swinging clubs from a tabletop, smashing mirrors and pottery throughout the house, even knocking golf balls into the soup bowl of a neighbor (Oliver Hardy).

Cast
 Larry Semon as The son
 Lucille Carlisle as The daughter, the Blonde Flapper
 Al Thompson as The father
 Oliver Hardy as The neighbor (as Babe Hardy)
 Vernon Dent as The suitor
 William Hauber as Mr. Dub
 Fred Lancaster as Golfer
 Joe Rock as Golfer (as Joe Basil)
 Pete Gordon as Golfer
 Vincent McDermott
 Fred Gamble
 Eva Thatcher as Mrs. Dub

See also
 List of American films of 1922
 Oliver Hardy filmography

References

External links

Clip of the film at silentera.com

1922 films
1922 short films
American silent short films
American black-and-white films
American sports comedy films
Films directed by Tom Buckingham
Films directed by Larry Semon
Golf films
American comedy short films
1920s sports comedy films
1922 comedy films
1920s American films
Silent American comedy films
1920s English-language films
Silent sports comedy films